A star transit is the passage of a star across the field of view of a telescope eyepiece.

The precise observation of star transits is the basis of many methods in astronomy and in geodesy. The measurements can be done in different ways:
 visually (mostly up to 1990): accuracy 0,1" to 2" (depending on the instrument); timing with digital clocks about 0,05–0,2 seconds
 by CCD and other electro-optical sensors: as above, time often better
 semi automatic instruments: Photography or "impersonal micrometer", ca. 2 times better than No.1
 by Scanning methods: Astrometry satellites like Hipparcos about 0,01".

See also
 Accuracy and precision
 Instrument error
 Meridian circle
 Minute and second of arc
 Theodolite
 Transit instrument

Literature
 Karl Ramsayer, 1969: Geodätische Astronomie, Vol.2a of Handbuch der Vermessungskunde, 900 p., J.B.Metzler-Verlag Stuttgart.
 Ivan I. Mueller, 1969: Spherical and Practical Astronomy as applied to Geodesy, 610 p., Fred.Ungar publ., USA
 IAU Coll.48: Modern Astrometry, Egermann, University Vienna.

Astrometry